Santosh Vempala (born 18 October 1971) is a prominent computer scientist. He is a Distinguished Professor of Computer Science at the Georgia Institute of Technology. His main work has been in the area of Theoretical Computer Science.

Biography

Vempala secured B.Tech. degree in Computer Science and Engineering from Indian Institute of Technology, Delhi, in 1992 then he attended Carnegie Mellon University, where he received his Ph.D. in 1997 under professor Avrim Blum.

In 1997, he was awarded a Miller Fellowship at Berkeley.  Subsequently, he was a professor at MIT in the Mathematics Department, until he moved to Georgia Tech in 2006.

Work
His main work has been in the area of theoretical computer science, with particular activity in the fields of algorithms, randomized algorithms, computational geometry, and computational learning theory, including the authorship of books on random projection and spectral methods.<ref name="Spectral Algorithms">R. Kannan and S. Vempala,``Spectral Algorithms, Now Publishers Inc., 2009.</ref>

In 2008, he co-founded the Computing for Good (C4G) program at Georgia Tech.

Honors and awards
Vempala has received numerous awards, including a Guggenheim Fellowship, Sloan Fellowship, and being listed in 
Georgia Trend's 40 under 40''.
He was named Fellow of ACM "For contributions to algorithms for convex sets and probability distributions" in 2015. He was named a Fellow of the American Mathematical Society, in the 2022 class of fellows, "for contributions to randomized algorithms, high-dimensional geometry, and numerical linear algebra, and service to the profession".

References

External links
 Santosh Vempala's home page

1971 births
Georgia Tech faculty
Living people
Computer science educators
Theoretical computer scientists
Indian emigrants to the United States
Carnegie Mellon University alumni
Fellows of the Association for Computing Machinery
Fellows of the American Mathematical Society
Scientists from Visakhapatnam